Rooi Mahamutsa (born 26 October 1981 in Standerton) is a South African association football defender.

Career
It was Rooi Mahamutsa's goal that helped Orlando Pirates to only its second CAF Champions League final in 18 years, his header giving Pirates the lead against Esperance de Tunis of Tunisia in a game that eventually ended in a tie, with Pirates making it through by virtue of the away goal rule.

References

1981 births
Living people
People from Standerton
South African soccer players
Association football defenders
Witbank Spurs F.C. players
Orlando Pirates F.C. players
Free State Stars F.C. players
Cape Town Spurs F.C. players
TS Sporting F.C. players
South African Premier Division players
South Africa international soccer players